Valentinus is a Roman masculine given name derived from the Latin word "valens" meaning "healthy, strong". It may refer to:

People

Churchmen
Pope Valentine (died 827)
Saint Valentine, 3rd century Christian saint
Valentinus (Gnostic) (died c. 150), early Christian gnostic theologian
Valentinus Paquay (1828–1905), Friar Minor
Valentinus Smalcius (1572–1622), German Socinian theologian

Emperors and pretenders
Valentinus (rebel), 4th-century Roman exile who attempted a conspiracy in Roman Britain
Valentinus (usurper) (died 644), Byzantine general and usurper, father of empress Fausta

Scholars
Basilius Valentinus, 15th century monk from Erfurt who may have described bismuth
Valentinus Lublinus (16th-century–16th-century), 16th-century Polish physician and editor
Valentinus Otho (died 1603), German mathematician and astronomer
Valentinus Nabodus (1523–1593), German mathematician, astronomer and astrologer

Biology
Anacyclus valentinus, a species of aster
Ischnocolus valentinus, a small, old-world tarantula
Squalius valentinus, a species of freshwater fish in the carp family Cyprinidae

See also
Valentin, given name
Valentina (given name), the feminine of Valentinus
Valentine (disambiguation)
Valentinian (disambiguation)